The fourth season of Bad Girls Club premiered on December 1, 2009, on Oxygen. This season's reunion was hosted by Perez Hilton and is the first season to have more than one part. Oxygen renewed Bad Girls Club for a fourth season in April 2009. Production of the season 4 began in June 2009, similar to seasons 1 through 3. Casting began several weeks before the season premiere of season 3 with potential applicants submitting video tape submissions. Casting calls, similar to previous seasons of the Bad Girls Club, began in Los Angeles, California and later other major cities Atlanta, Buffalo, Oakland, Chicago, and Philadelphia.

House
The Bad Girls Club house, similar to previous seasons, features free accessories such as shoes, purses, and jewelries which were displayed as add-ons on the walls of the house. Inside the house, in the middle, has a "light fixture" which features, colors such as pink and purple décor. The fixture was also made up of patterns of high heels which was displayed above the centered circular small black couch. In the living room, the girls was given spotted light color couches which was in front of paintings of various cities. Close to the paintings, were, the Bad Girls Club oath which sits above the fireplace. The girls was also give a 1960s replica of a wall Trimphone, instead of today's modern house phones. Inside the girls rooms features adult toys and statues of half naked men which were displayed on the walls of some of the girls rooms. There was also a "Screaming O" vending machine which the girls had to pay a fee in order to receive adult toys, similar to a full-line vending. The vanity room, also features, 1960s furniture, which the girls go to apply beauty supplies and/or get ready for clubbing. The jacuzzi was placed, in front of the computer which had speakers connecting to the computer. The jacuzzi was also placed inside the house. In the back of the house, the girls was given a modern pool, and an outside modern swing, which the girls could get some shade. Inside the pool, however, features a queen size floating bed which floats around the pool. The kitchen features a more 1970s look, with light patterns. The girls were also given gas stoves. The kitchen table featured light green, black, white, and orange colors.

Around the house, former bad girls, most famous quotes and a picture of themselves were displayed all over the mansion. For the "new comers" their self-portraits were left blank. When Natalie and Annie showed up first inside the house, they quickly targeted the other new girls pictures with first impression comments, which didn't sit right when the girls began arriving to the house. Once Portia left, her most famous quote was displayed, along with her photo, in the bad girls house. During the season finale of season 4, all seven girls were given their spot on the walls with their most famous quotes and a picture of themselves. Pictures of former bad girls housemates were displayed around the house, where the most intense arguments, fights, and break-downs occurred, a photo of their breakdowns were also featured in the locations where the moment had happened.

Cast 
The season began with seven original bad girls, of which one left voluntarily and three were removed by production. One replacement bad girl was introduced in their absences later in the season.

Duration of cast

Episodes

Notes

References 

2009 American television seasons
2010 American television seasons
Bad Girls Club seasons
Television shows set in Los Angeles